This is a list of cities in the United States that field or have fielded teams in North American men's professional sports leagues, showing the number of league championships each city has won. The championships won are recorded for the cities only, not the individual franchises. When a team relocates to a new city, the number of championships won in the prior city remain with that city.

Championships counted are only from the top-tier/dominant league or leagues in each of the five major North American team sports — American football, baseball, basketball, ice hockey as well as soccer (or association football).

 American football championships include Super Bowl champions (1966–present) as well as pre–Super Bowl era champions: National Football League (1920–1965); All-America Football Conference (1946–1949; merged with NFL in 1950); and American Football League (1960–1965; agreed to merger in 1966, absorbed into NFL in 1970).
 Canadian football championships includes Grey Cup winners.
 Baseball championships include World Series champions (1903–present). 
 Basketball championships include NBA Finals champions (1947–present), and the American Basketball Association (1968–1976; merged with NBA in 1976–77 season).
 Ice hockey championships include Stanley Cup champions (1915–present) since the end of the Challenge Cup era (ended March 1914), and the World Hockey Association (1973–1979; merged with NHL in 1979–80 season).
 Soccer (or association football) championships include those from the North American Soccer League (1968–1984); its forerunners, the United Soccer Association (1967) and National Professional Soccer League (1967) which merged to form the NASL in 1968; and Major League Soccer (1996–present).

Cities that can claim no titles have been excluded from these rankings unless they are currently represented in at least one of the five major leagues, in which case they have a zero total.

Table
Current through Super Bowl LVII

See also
List of North American cities by number of major sports championships

References 

Championships
Sports teams in the United States by city